Attorney General Osborne may refer to:

Frank I. Osborne (1853–1920), Attorney General of North Carolina
Algernon Willoughby Osborne (died 1915), Attorney-General of the Gold Coast

See also
General Osborn (disambiguation)